The Naval Aircraft Factory PT were two types of floatplanes built from surplus and spare parts by the United States Navy's Naval Aircraft Factory.

Development
With a shortage of funds at the end of the First World War, the Naval Aircraft Factory built 33 aircraft of two types using surplus assemblies. Both were twin float biplanes based on the fuselage and tail unit of the Curtiss R-6L; the PT-1 was fitted with the 62 ft (18.90m) wings from the Curtiss HS-1L, and the PT-2 fitted with the 74 ft (22.57m) wings from the Curtiss HS-2L.

Variants
PT-1
Fuselage and tail unit of a Curtiss R-6L fitted with wings from a Curtiss HS-1L, 15 built.
PT-2
Fuselage and tail unit of a Curtiss R-6L fitted with wings from a Curtiss HS-2L, 18 built.

Operator

United States Navy

Specifications (PT-2)

See also

References

External links

1920s United States military trainer aircraft
Floatplanes
PT
Biplanes
Single-engined tractor aircraft
Aircraft first flown in 1922